Bitly is a URL shortening service and a link management platform. The company Bitly, Inc. was established in 2008. It is privately held and based in New York City. Bitly shortens 600 million links per month, for use in social networking, SMS, and email. Bitly makes money by charging for access to aggregate data created as a result of many people using the shortened URLs.

In 2017, Spectrum Equity acquired a majority stake in Bitly for $64 million.

Products 
The Bitly URL shortening service became popular on Twitter after it became the default URL shortening service on the website on May 6, 2009. It was subsequently replaced by Twitter's own t.co service.

The company behind Bitly launched a similar service, but for online videos, to determine what videos are the most popular on the web.

The company offers a paid solution called Bitly Enterprise that provides advanced branding features, audience intel, omnichannel campaign tracking and more. Companies can use their own custom domains to generate shortened links; for example, The New York Times uses nyti.ms, and Pepsi uses pep.si, Google uses goo.gle.  This allows the company to push brand awareness on services such as Twitter but use the Bitly engine to generate the shortened URLs and track marketing metrics. Bitly Enterprise also has advanced analytics features and uses Bitly data to provide advanced social insight tools for companies and brands.

Technology 
The company uses HTTP 301 redirects for its links. The shortcuts are intended to be permanent and cannot be changed once they are created. URLs that are shortened with the bitly service use the bit.ly domain or any other generic domain that the service offers.

Starting October 12, 2010, users could automatically generate QR codes that, when scanned with a mobile QR code reader, automatically directed users to shortened links.

On May 29, 2012, Bitly announced "Bitmarks", a new search feature, with enhanced public profiles and an iPhone app.

Preview short URLs
To see a short URL's information, that is to reveal or preview any Bitly URL https://bit.ly/x just append a plus sign "+", as in https://bit.ly/x+, for example https://bit.ly/1sNZMwL should be copy and pasted into the browser address bar as https://bit.ly/1sNZMwL+.
This allows users to see and check the long URL before visiting it.

Alternative domains
.ly is the country code top-level domain (ccTLD) for Libya. In 2011, the bit.ly address was set to redirect to bitly.com.

The .ly TLD is controlled by the Libyan government, which has previously removed one domain deemed incompatible with Muslim law.

Bitly users on paid plans can use a custom domain registered separately by the user and redirected to Bitly's servers via the DNS record. 

Bitly used to offer additional domains: bitly.com and j.mp (using the top-level domain of the Northern Mariana Islands, a commonwealth of the United States). This functionality is no longer available.

See also 
 Google URL Shortener
 TinyURL
 URL redirection

References

External links
 

URL-shortening services
American companies established in 2008
Internet properties established in 2008
Internet technology companies of the United States
2008 establishments in New York City